Theodore Gerela (March 12, 1944 – July 16, 2020) was an award-winning kicker in the Canadian Football League.

Life
Gerela, a graduate of Washington State University, joined the British Columbia Lions in 1967 and played with them for 7 seasons. Though he was a versatile player (rushing 16 times, catching 13 passes and making 2 interceptions, as well as punting one season), he was unique in that he was primarily a kicking specialist. Previously, most kickers played another primary position. While not accurate by later standards (he only made 123 of 271 field goal attempts), he had a strong leg and regularly made field goals of 50 plus yards. He won the Dr. Beattie Martin Trophy as best rookie in the Western Conference in 1967.

Most notably, in 1968, he hit 30 field goals, which was a record for any professional league. He also won the conference scoring title, ushering in the era of the kicking specialist. All-Star selections were not made for kickers during his career. As of 2011, his 570 points was still the 3rd highest in the Lions' history.

Gerela came from a particularly gifted family. His brothers were also professional kickers; Roy Gerela with the Super Bowl champion Pittsburgh Steelers and Metro Gerela briefly with the Montreal Alouettes (Metro is enshrined in the Canadian Soccer Hall of Fame.) In 1993, his son, Ted Gerela, was drafted in the 7th round of the 1993 CFL Draft by the BC Lions as a linebacker from Rocky Mountain College.

Gerala died July 16, 2020 from cancer.

References

1944 births
2020 deaths
Canadian football placekickers
Players of Canadian football from Alberta
BC Lions players
Washington State Cougars football players
Canadian Football League Rookie of the Year Award winners